Matteotti is an Italian surname. Notable people with the surname include:

Giacomo Matteotti (1885–1924), Italian politician
Gianmatteo Matteotti (1921–2000), Italian politician
Luca Matteotti (born 1989), Italian snowboarder

See also 
Ponte Giacomo Matteotti, is a bridge that links Lungotevere Arnaldo da Brescia to Piazza delle Cinque Giornate in Rome, Italy
The Assassination of Matteotti, is a 1973 Italian historical drama film directed by Florestano Vancin
Trofeo Matteotti, is a single-day road bicycle race held annually in Pescara, Italy

Italian-language surnames
Patronymic surnames
Surnames from given names